The Whitetail Clean Energy is a proposed power station in Wilton, Redcar and Cleveland, England. The generating process of the plant is listed as a "clean energy source", using natural gas and oxygen in a Allam-Fetvedt Cycle to create power. The excess carbon dioxide not used by the co-generation process is intended to be captured and stored under the North Sea, making the plant the first in the United Kingdom to utilise this type of technology, and also using carbon sequestration under the North Sea. The plant is also included in the Net Zero Teesside project. The power plant is proposed to start generating in 2025.

Proposal
The power station, which is a joint venture between 8 Rivers Capital and Sembcorp (UK), is expected to create 2,000 jobs in the building process, with a further 200 to run the plant on a day-to-day basis. The plant would combust pure oxygen with natural gas, using a high pressure carbon dioxide (CO2) stream (supercritical carbon dioxide), rather than steam to rotate a turbine, which would generate the electricity. The CO2 stream would then be fed through a heat exchanger and then cooled. Excess  of around 800,000 tons per year would be captured and stored under the North Sea.

Whilst the Allam-Fetvedt Cycle was not successfully tested until 2018, the UK government had been supporting a zero CO2 project on Teesside since 2012. The plant was described as being the United Kingdom's first "net zero" power station, and the first to use the carbon capture and storage technology. Whilst the power generation process does not emit any CO2, it does produce it in the closed loop system. The excess gas is intended to be store, but can also be utilised for other purposes. The power plant would be located within the Teesside Freeport Zone and subject to regulatory approval, the scheme could be up and running by 2025. 8 Rivers Capital stated that it had completed a pre-FEED (front end engineering design) study in early 2021, which was partly funded by the UK Department for Business, Energy & Industrial Strategy.

The UK government Minister of State for Business, Energy and Clean Growth, Anne-Marie Trevelyan, stated that the project was a "..real game-changer [and would] revitalise this key industrial heartland." The labour MP for Stockton North, Alex Cunningham, described the announcement as "great news", but wanted assurances that jobs at the plant would go to local people. The plant will also be part of the Net Zero Teesside project, which plans to be the first decarbonised industrial cluster in the world. This project aims to enable the heavy industry on Teesside somewhere to store the carbon produced during their processes, rather than emitting them into the atmosphere.

See also
Allam power cycle

References

External links
 Process diagram for Allam-Fetvedt Cycle
Net Zero Teesside

Power stations in North East England
Buildings and structures in North Yorkshire
Natural gas-fired power stations in England
Cogeneration power stations in England